The Stemme S10 is a self-launching sailplane produced by Stemme AG in Strausberg (Germany) since the 1980s. The engine is mounted amidships and it features an unusual folding propeller which is stowed inside the aircraft's nose-cone when the engine is not in use.

Design and development
The Stemme S10 also has several unusual features such as a tailwheel undercarriage and a side-by-side cockpit. It does not have a tow hook connection so it must self-launch. The two main wheels retract and lower electrically, though they can also be lowered manually if needed. The engine restart time is 5 seconds. A solar panel can provide additional electrical power during long flights. It has a steerable tailwheel, Schempp-Hirth spoilers and optional winglets. The current variant, the S10-VT, has a variable-pitch propeller which allows more power during take off, and a new turbocharged Bombardier Rotax 914F engine in place of the earlier Limbach L2400. Most parts are made in Poland, but future production will be handled by Remos Aircraft.

There is also an unpiloted version, the S-UAV, again intended for surveillance.

Operational history

Atmospheric measurements were made with S10 VT during the Mountain Wave Project (MWP) Expedition Argentina'99  record flight to Tierra del Fuego and during Expedition Mendoza 2006, when scientific measurements of atmospheric turbulence were made up to  around and over the highest mountain of the Americas, Aconcagua.
 

Two examples were used by the United States Air Force Academy between 1995 and 2002 under the designation TG-11A.

In December 2017, the Colombian Air Force received two Stemme S10 VTs for training purposes.

Variants
S10
Standard production variant.
S10V
Variable pitch prop variant.

S10VC
Surveillance variant with underwing sensor pods.
S10-VT
115hp Turbocharged Rotax 914F power.
TG-11A
S10s operated by the U.S. Air Force Academy

Specifications (S 10-VT)

References

External links

Manufacturer's website
USAF AETC website
Mountain Wave Project website with FAI-world records - S10 VT

S10
1980s German sailplanes
Motor gliders
T-tail aircraft
Single-engined tractor aircraft
High-wing aircraft
Mid-engined aircraft
Aircraft first flown in 1986